Gymnopilus karnalensis is a species of mushroom in the family Hymenogastraceae.

See also

List of Gymnopilus species

External links
Gymnopilus karnalensis at Index Fungorum

karnalensis
Fungi of North America